The 2020–21 UCI Track Cycling season is the sixteenth season of the UCI Track Cycling season. The 2020–21 season began on 30 July 2020 with the Sei Giorni delle Rose and will end in October 2021. It is organised by the Union Cycliste Internationale.

Events

2020

Continental Championships

National Championships

From a standing start

Elimination Race

Sprint

Keirin

Time Trial

Omnium

Points Race

Scratch

Individual Pursuit

Madison

Team Sprint

Team Pursuit

See also
2007 in track cycling
2008 in track cycling

References

2020 in track cycling
2021 in track cycling
Track cycling by year